View from the Vault, Volume Two (or View from the Vault II) is the second entry in the "View from the Vault" series by the Grateful Dead.  It was released simultaneously as a three-disk CD and a one-disk DVD.  This volume features the June 14, 1991 concert at Robert F. Kennedy Stadium in Washington, D.C., and bonus material from a show at the same venue on July 12, 1990. It is the only Grateful Dead video release featuring Vince Welnick and Bruce Hornsby.

The DVD contains one track that is not on the CD, "Box of Rain", recorded at the 1990 show.  It also includes a music video, "Liberty", directed by Justin Kreutzmann, the son of Dead drummer Bill Kreutzmann. The video uses audio from March 30, 1994, Atlanta, which was previously released on So Many Roads (1965–1995).  The "Rubin and Cherise" on the DVD menu is from the show on June 9, 1991. The set was certified Gold by the RIAA on February 27, 2003.

Track listing

Disc one

First set:
"Cold Rain & Snow" (trad., arr. Grateful Dead) – 7:00
"Wang Dang Doodle" (Willie Dixon) – 6:39
"Jack-a-Roe" (trad., arr. Grateful Dead) – 5:48
"Big River" (Johnny Cash) – 5:43 →
"Maggie's Farm" (Bob Dylan) – 7:44
"Row Jimmy" (Robert Hunter, Jerry Garcia) – 11:04
"Black-Throated Wind" (John Barlow, Bob Weir) – 7:19
"Tennessee Jed" (Hunter, Garcia) – 7:49
"The Music Never Stopped" (Barlow, Weir) – 8:55

Disc two

Second set:
"Help On the Way" (Hunter, Garcia) – 4:33 →
"Slipknot!" (Garcia, Keith Godchaux, Bill Kreutzmann, Phil Lesh, Weir) – 8:30 →
"Franklin's Tower" (Hunter, Garcia, Kreutzmann) – 12:27
"Estimated Prophet" (Barlow, Weir) – 13:08 →
 "Dark Star" (Hunter, Garcia, Mickey Hart, Kreutzmann, Lesh, Ron McKernan, Weir) – 11:29 →
"Drums" (Hart, Kreutzmann) – 9:54 →
"Space" (Garcia, Lesh, Weir) – 6:26 →

Disc three

Second set, continued:
"Stella Blue" (Hunter, Garcia) – 13:10 →
"Turn on Your Love Light" (Deadric Malone, Joseph Scott) – 9:13
Encore:
"It's All Over Now, Baby Blue" (Dylan) – 7:16
July 12, 1990 – second set:
"Victim or the Crime" (Gerrit Graham, Weir) – 8:29 →
"Foolish Heart" (Hunter, Garcia) – 10:10 →
"Dark Star" (Hunter, Garcia, Hart, Kreutzmann, Lesh, McKernan, Weir) – 24:58

Personnel
Jerry Garcia – lead guitar, vocals
Bob Weir – rhythm guitar, vocals
Phil Lesh – bass guitar, vocals
Vince Welnick – keyboards, vocals
Mickey Hart – drums, percussion
Bill Kreutzmann – drums, percussion
Bruce Hornsby – accordion, piano, synthesizer, vocals
Brent Mydland - keyboards, vocals (July 12, 1990 bonus footage)
Len Dell'Amico - co-producer, director
Dan Healy – recording
Dick Latvala – tape archivist
David Lemieux – tape archivist
Eileen Law – archival research
Robert Minkin – design
Susana Millman – photography
 Candace Brightman – Lighting

See also
 View from the Vault, Volume One
 View from the Vault, Volume Three
 View from the Vault, Volume Four

Notes

References
Levy, Eric. "Interview from the Vault: A Conversation with David Lemieux", The Music Box, March 2002, Volume 9, #3

02
2001 live albums
2001 video albums
Live video albums